Gisele Faria (born 16 August 1968) is a Brazilian former professional tennis player.

Faria, who grew up in Santos, competed on the professional tour in the 1980s. She made her only Grand Slam main-draw appearance at the 1988 French Open, partnering Luciana Corsato in the women's doubles.

ITF finals

Singles: 0–1

Doubles: 4–0

References

External links
 
 

1968 births
Living people
Brazilian female tennis players
Sportspeople from Santos, São Paulo
21st-century Brazilian women
20th-century Brazilian women